Rucker Spur is a rock spur between Alexander Peak and Mount Ronne, on the east side of the Haines Mountains in Marie Byrd Land. Mapped by the United States Antarctic Service (USAS) (1939–41). Named by Advisory Committee on Antarctic Names (US-ACAN) for Joseph T. Rucker, photographer with the Byrd Antarctic Expedition (1928–30).
 

Ridges of Marie Byrd Land